Sitiveni Waica Sivivatu (born 19 April 1982 in Suva, Fiji) is a retired New Zealand rugby union footballer, playing on the position of a wing. He was largely successful in the 2005 Super 12 season playing for the Chiefs. He acquired a starting position in the All Blacks, and scored 29 tries in 45 tests.

He also scored 4 tries for the Pacific Islanders in 2004 – 2 against the All Blacks, and 2 against South Africa. Since the Pacific Islanders team has been sanctioned by the IRB, his 4 tries for them stands.

Early life
Sivivatu attended Ratu Kadavulevu School in Fiji before moving to New Zealand when he was 15. He attended Wesley College, the school that produced All Blacks great Jonah Lomu. He first played in the National Provincial Championship with second division side Counties Manukau, eventually moving to the first division with Waikato. He was the only 2nd division player in NZ to win a Super Rugby contract. He regards as his hero Philippe Sella because "he could just do anything on the field of play. If he decided to drop he could do it from anywhere within his range, and he was an amazing player with ball in hand."

Pacific Islanders
Sivivatu played for the inaugural Pacific Islanders rugby union team
against the Australian Wallabies in 2004. Among his teammates were Sione Lauaki who also became an All Black. Sivivatu and fellow All Black wing Joe Rokocoko regard themselves as "cousins" as Sivivatu lived with the Rokocoko family.

All Blacks
He was first named in a trials squad for All Black selection in 2004. He made his Test debut against Fiji and broke the All Blacks record by scoring four tries. Sivivatu was selected for the All Blacks in 2005 and started in all three of the All Blacks Tests against the British & Irish Lions on their 2005 tour of New Zealand, scoring tries in the first two Tests.

Move to France
In March 2011, he signed a two-year deal with French rugby giants, ASM Clermont Auvergne. He was signed as a replacement for Fijian flyer Napolioni Nalaga, who returned to Fiji due to personal problems. He was not included in the New Zealand squad for the 2011 Rugby World Cup.

In June 2016, Sivivatu retired as a player for Castres and joined the staff as a technical adviser and help integrate foreign players.

Controversy
On 11 April 2007 Sivivatu pleaded guilty to slapping his wife in March 2007. He was discharged without conviction and ordered to pay a fine. On leaving court Sivivatu said "I'm clearly sorry about what I did".

It is believed that Sivivatu is joining the New Zealand Warriors in 2023 as their defensive coach, which has surprised many Rugby Union critics.

References

Sources
SA Sports Illustrated. "My Hero: Four All Black rugby players reveal their sport heroes." October 2008: 35.

External links

1982 births
New Zealand rugby union players
New Zealand people of I-Taukei Fijian descent
New Zealand international rugby union players
Chiefs (rugby union) players
Counties Manukau rugby union players
Waikato rugby union players
ASM Clermont Auvergne players
Rugby union wings
Fijian emigrants to New Zealand
People educated at Wesley College, Auckland
Living people
Sportspeople from Suva
Expatriate rugby union players in France
People educated at Ratu Kadavulevu School